Lake Bistineau State Park is one of twenty-two state parks in the U.S. state of Louisiana. It is located in Doyline in Webster Parish, about a half hour east of Shreveport.

History 
Lake Bistineau was created by a flood after a log jam in 1800, but the lake gradually drained over time. In 1935, construction on a dam began, and the park was opened in 1938. It was the first state park to accommodate African-Americans, with two separate areas of the modern-day park reflecting the historical segregated nature of the park.

Activities 
Lake Bistineau State Park offers over 10 miles of hiking trails, as well and camping, boating, paddling, and various other outdoor activities.

References 

State parks of Louisiana
Protected areas of Webster Parish, Louisiana
Protected areas established in 1938
1938 establishments in Louisiana